The Kentucky Justice and Public Safety Cabinet (JPSC) is an agency of the U.S. Commonwealth of Kentucky that is responsible for providing law enforcement, criminal justice and correctional services to the citizens of Kentucky. The Cabinet is headed by a Cabinet Secretary appointed by the Governor of Kentucky, with the consent of the Kentucky State Senate. The Cabinet Secretary is a key member of the Governor's senior policy staff.

The current Secretary for the Justice and Public Safety Cabinet is Kerry B. Harvey, who was appointed by Governor Andy Beshear replacing Mary C. Noble in 2021.

Organization
The Justice and Public Safety Cabinet is headed by a Secretary, who is appointed by the Governor. The Secretary is assisted in managing the Cabinet by a Deputy Secretary, who oversees the activities of the Cabinet in the absence of the Secretary. The Cabinet is composed of several agencies and organizational units. The staff of the Cabinet is divided between the Executive Staff, which provides management and administrative services to the entire Cabinet, and the Departmental Staff, which perform the work of the Cabinet.

Cabinet Secretary
Deputy Secretary
Office of the Secretary
Kentucky State Police
Kentucky Department of Criminal Justice Training
Law Enforcement Council
Kentucky Department of Corrections
State Corrections Commission
Kentucky Department of Juvenile Justice
Kentucky Department of Public Advocacy
Office of Drug Control Policy
Office of Legal Services
Office of Legislative and Intergovernmental Services
Criminal Justice Council
Office of Management and Administrative Services
Office of the State Medical Examiner
Office of Investigations
Kentucky Parole Board

External links
Kentucky Justice and Public Safety Cabinet homepage

Justice and Public Safety Cabinet